We Players is a site-integrated theater company based in the San Francisco Bay Area. The company was founded in 2000 by Ava Roy, its Artistic Director, while she was a student at Stanford University.

Site-integration venue 
We Players programs are interactive, taking place at typically outdoor locations rather than inside a theatre building. The intent is to use the physical environment to affect the audience's perception of the play and allow viewers to get involved in the production as it is performed in and around the audience.

Partnership with National and State Park Services
In November 2008 Amy Brees, the National Park Service’s Alcatraz site supervisor, invited Ava Roy, We Players’ Artistic Director, to be the first artist-in-residence on the island.  Since then, the theater company has co-operated with the National Park Service and California State Parks by bring their  performances into these areas turning public park spaces into "impromptu playhouses". In 2012 the theatre company entered into a five-year cooperative agreement with San Francisco Maritime National Historical Park to perform in the park.

Productions
2006 - The Tempest at the Albany Bulb
2008 - Macbeth at Fort Point
2009 - Iphigenia and Other Daughters on Alcatraz
2010 - Hamlet on Alcatraz
2011 - Cellhouse Dance and social justice symposium on Alcatraz
2011 - The Odyssey on Alma
2012 - Twelfth Night at Hyde Street Pier 
2012 - The Odyssey on Angel Island State Park
2013 - Macbeth at Fort Point
2014 - Macbeth at Fort Point
2014 - King Fool at Battery Wallace in the Marin Headlands
2015 - Ondine at Sutro
2015 - HEROMONSTER at The Chapel at Fort Mason Center for Arts and Culture
2016 - The Capulet Ball (multiple locations including: private residence in San Anselmo, St. John's Episcopal Church in San Francisco, Impact Hub in Oakland, and Castello di Amorosa in St. Helena)
2016 - Romeo and Juliet at Rancho Petaluma Adobe State Historic Park
2016 - Romeo and Juliet at Villa Montalvo
2017 - BEOWULF at SF Maritime & Fort Mason
2017 - Midsummer of Love at Strawberry Hill in Stow Lake, Golden Gate Park
2017 - Midsummer of Love at Kennedy Grove, East Bay Regional Park
2017 - Mother Lear (multiple locations, public and private including the Montalvo Arts Center, McLaren Park, and the East Bay JCC) 
2018 - Roman Women at The Palace of Fine Arts
2018 - CAESAR MAXIMUS at The Music Concourse 
2018 - Mother Lear (multiple locations, public and private including the Marin Civic Center) 
2019 - Undiscovered Country at Sunnyside Conservatory
2019 - Mother Lear  (multiple locations, public and private including Mission Hospice and as part the SF International Arts Festival)

References

Further reading

Theatre companies in San Francisco
Theatre in the San Francisco Bay Area
Organizations based in San Francisco